Sidney Clyde Gaunt (c. 1874 - 1932) was an American type designer and artist.

He was a prolific producer of type designs while "shop artist" for Barnhart Brothers & Spindler Type Foundry. He had his own studio in New York City in the early 1920s.

Typefaces
 Authors Roman series (BB&S later ATF)
 Authors Roman + Wide + Italic (1902)
 Authors Roman Bold (1909)
 Authors Oldstyle + Italic + Bold (1912)
 Authors Roman Condensed (1915)
 Authors Roman Bold Condensed (1916)
 Talisman (1903, BB&S), later reissued as Rugged Bold.
 Talisman Italic (1904, BB&S), later reissued as Rugged Bold Italic.
 Wedding Plate-Script (1904, BB&S later ATF)
 Stationers Semi-Script (1904, BB&S later ATF), a redesign of Inland Type Foundry's Palmer Series of 1899.
 French Plate Script (1904, BB&S later ATF), based on types cut by Fonderie Gustave Mayeur of Paris
 Mission (1904, BB&S later ATF), designed by Gaunt but patented by  George Oswald Ottley.
 Barnhart Oldstyle series
 Barnhart Oldstyle (1906, BB&S later ATF)
 Barnhart Oldstyle Italic + Oldstyle No. 2 (1907, BB&S later ATF)
 Barnhart Lightface (1914, BB&S)
 Adstyle series (BB&S later ATF)
 Adstyle (1906)
 Adstyle Black (1907–11)
 Adstyle Condensed (1907–11)
 Adstyle Extra Condensed (1907–11)
 Adstyle Headletter (1907–11)
 Adstyle Italic (1907–11)
 Adstyle Wide (1907–11)
 Adstyle Black Outline (1910)
 Adstyle Lightface (1911)
 Adstyle Shaded (1914)
 Old Roman series (BB&S later ATF), adapted from T.W. Smith's original design for H.W. Caslon & Company in England.
 Old Roman Condensed (1907)
 Old Roman Bold + Bold Condensed + Semitone (1908)
 Engravers Old Black (1910, BB&S) a knock-off of  ATF's Engravers Old English.
 Cardstyle (1914, BB&S later ATF) Capitals and small caps only.
 Engravers Roman Shaded (1914, BB&S later ATF)
 Chester Text (1914, BB&S later ATF) Capitals and small caps only.
 Pencraft Oldstyle series (BB&S later ATF)
 Pencraft Oldstyle + Italic (1914)
 Pencraft Bold (1915)
 Pencraft Shaded (1916)
 Publicity Gothic (1916, BB&S later ATF), later digitized by Fonts.Com and MyFonts.
 Pencraft Text (1916, BB&S later ATF)
 Parsons Swash Initials (BB&S), alternate characters for Will Ransom's Parsons series cut without Ransom's approval.

References
 MacGrew, Mac, "American Metal Typefaces of the Twentieth Century," Oak Knoll Books, New Castle Delaware, 1993, .

External links
Digitized versions of his type from Myfonts
Samples of his type faces from the Klingspor Museum

American typographers and type designers
1932 deaths
American graphic designers
Year of birth uncertain